Tracy Chapman is the debut album by American singer-songwriter Tracy Chapman, released on April 5, 1988, by Elektra Records. The album was recorded at the Powertrax studio in Hollywood, California. In 1987, Chapman was discovered by fellow Tufts University student Brian Koppelman. He offered to show her work to his father, who owned a successful publishing company; however, she did not consider the offer to be serious. After multiple performances, however, Koppelman found a demo tape of her singing her single "Talkin' 'bout a Revolution", which he promoted to radio stations, and she was eventually signed to Elektra Records.

In early attempts to produce the first album, many producers turned down Chapman as they did not favor her musical direction.  David Kershenbaum, however, decided to produce it as he wanted to record an acoustic music album. It was recorded in Hollywood, California, in eight weeks. Most of the writing is based on political and social causes.

Tracy Chapman gained critical acclaim from a wide majority of music critics, praising the simplicity, Chapman's vocal ability and her political and social lyrical content. The album received commercial success in most of the countries it was released, making it to the top of the charts in many countries, including Austria, Canada, New Zealand, Switzerland, Denmark, and the United Kingdom. It peaked at No. 1 on the US Billboard 200 and was certified six-times platinum by the Recording Industry Association of America (RIAA), with sales exceeding over six million copies in the United States alone.

Three singles were released from the album, with the most commercially successful single being "Fast Car". The song was performed at the Nelson Mandela 70th Birthday Tribute. It rose to the top ten on the US Billboard Hot 100 and also did well in Australia, New Zealand, Ireland, the United Kingdom, and other European countries. Tracy Chapman is one of the best-selling albums of all time with sales of over 20 million copies worldwide.

Background
In 1987, Chapman was discovered by fellow Tufts University student Brian Koppelman. In an interview he said "I was helping organize a boycott protest against apartheid at school, and [someone] told me there was this great protest singer I should get to play at the rally." He went to see Chapman perform at a coffeehouse called Cappuccino. He said "Tracy walked onstage, and it was like an epiphany. Her presence, her voice, her songs, her sincerity—it all came across." After this, Koppelman told her that his father was at the time a co-owner of SBK Publishing and could help her make a record. She did not consider the offer seriously. Koppelman, however, was very interested in Chapman, so he attended most of her shows. She finally agreed to talk to him, but did not record any demos for him. He later discovered that she had recorded demos at the Tufts radio station WMFO for copyright purposes. Her demo of the song "Talkin' 'bout a Revolution" was taken to radio stations and, after the success, he copied it and took it to his father. According to the interview, "He immediately got the picture and flew up to see her." Her demo led her to a signing with Elektra Records. She said "I have to say that I never thought I would get a contract with a major record label [...] All the time since I was a kid listening to records and the radio, I didn't think there was any indication that record people would find the kind of music that I did marketable. Especially when I was singing songs like 'Talkin' 'bout a Revolution' during the Seventies [...] I didn't see a place for me there."

David Kershenbaum said that the album was "made for the right reasons". "There was a set of ideas that we wanted to communicate, and we felt if we were truthful and loyal to those ideas, then people would pick up on the emotion and the lyrical content that was there."

Recording
Chapman started writing songs when she was immediately signed to Elektra Records. Koppelman started finding producers for the album with the demo tape of her single "Talkin' 'bout a Revolution". However, she was turned down due to the popularity of dance-pop and synthpop at the time. They then found David Kershenbaum, who recalled later: "I'd been looking for something acoustic to do for some time . . . There was a sense in the industry of a slight boredom with everything out there and that people might be willing to listen again to lyrics and to someone who made statements."

Chapman's greatest concern during her meetings with Kershenbaum was that the integrity of her songs remain intact, because she wanted to record "real simple". Kershenbaum said, "I wanted to make sure that she was in front, vocally and thematically, and that everything was built around her." Every song that was featured on the result of the studio album was featured on her demo tape, except for "Fast Car", which resulted as one of the last songs recorded on the album. Kershenbaum recalled that the first time she sang and performed it for him, he "loved it the minute I [he] heard it."

The album was, in total, recorded in eight weeks at Powertrax, Kershenbaum's Hollywood studio. Interviewed in 2002 by The Guardian, Kershenbaum stated that a lot of the public wanted "what she had" and said, "And they weren't getting it. She got there at the right moment with stuff that was good." Chapman was also interviewed and talked about the background of the album. She said, "The first record [Tracy Chapman] is seen as being more social commentary . . . more political. But I think that's just all about perspective."

In an interview with The Guardian in 2008, Chapman said: "My first record was almost not my first record." The proposed producer for the studio album was killed in a car accident and the record company called in someone far less experienced to take over.

Critical reception

Tracy Chapman received acclaim from music critics. According to Rolling Stone, Chapman "caught everyone's ear in the hair-metal late Eighties" with the album. Stephen Thomas Erlewine from AllMusic wrote, "Arriving with little fanfare in the spring of 1988, Tracy Chapman's eponymous debut album became one of the key records of the Bush era, providing a touchstone for the entire PC movement while reviving the singer-songwriter tradition." According to Erlewine, "the juxtaposition of contemporary themes and classic production precisely is what makes the album distinctive – it brings the traditions into the present." He highlighted the album as her best album of her whole discography. Robert Christgau was less enthusiastic in his review for The Village Voice. He found "Fast Car" and "Mountains o' Things" very perceptive and Chapman an innately gifted singer but was disappointed by the presence of "begged questions" and "naive left-folkie truisms" such as "Talkin' 'bout a Revolution" and "Why": "She's too good for such condescension ... Get real, girl."

Awards
31st Annual Grammy Awards

Commercial response
Just two weeks after its release, the album sold one million copies worldwide, becoming a big commercial success. In total, it sold over 20 million copies worldwide and is one of the first albums by a female artist to have more than 10 million copies sold worldwide.

Legacy
In 1989, the album was rated No. 10 on Rolling Stone magazine's list of the "100 Greatest Albums of the 80s". In 2003, the album was ranked No. 261 on Rolling Stones list of "The 500 Greatest Albums of All Time", No. 263 in a 2012 revised list, and No. 256 in a 2020 revised list.

Slant Magazine listed the album at No. 49 on its list of "Best Albums of the 1980s".

The album was critically acclaimed and helped to revive the singer-songwriter tradition.

Track listing
All songs written by Tracy Chapman.

Personnel
Adapted credits from the album's booklet.

Musicians

Production

Charts

Weekly charts

Year-end charts

All-time charts

Sales and certifications

See also
 List of best-selling albums by women
 List of best-selling albums in Europe
 List of best-selling albums in France
 List of best-selling albums in Germany
 List of number-one albums of 1988 (U.S.)
 List of UK Albums Chart number ones of the 1980s

References

External links
Tracy Chapman (Adobe Flash) at Radio3Net (streamed copy where licensed)

Tracy Chapman albums
1988 debut albums
Grammy Award for Best Contemporary Folk Album
Elektra Records albums
Albums produced by David Kershenbaum